Günther Hillmann (born 15 April 1919 in Ludwigslust, 8 May 1976 in Nuremberg) was a German biochemist.  During the Second World War he worked on a research project to which the concentration camp doctor Josef Mengele delivered blood samples from Auschwitz concentration camp. After the war, he directed the Chemical Institute of the Nuremberg Hospitals for the rest of his life.

Publications 
 Über die Spaltung racemischer Aminosäuren in die optischen Antipoden in Verbindung mit der Peptidsynthese. (1947).
 Synthese des Schilddrüsenhormons. Tübingen 1955.
 Biosynthese und Stoffwechselwirkungen der Schilddrüsenhormone. Tübingen 1961.

External links 
 
 Achim Trunk: Zweihundert Blutproben aus Auschwitz - ein Forschungsvorhaben zwischen Anthropologie und Biochemie (1943-1945) - Reihe Ergebnisse, Bd. 12 der Kommission zur Kaiser-Wilhelm-Gesellschaft im Nationalsozialismus (PDF, 600 kB)

Secondary literature 
 Achim Trunk: Rassenforschung und Biochemie. Ein Projekt - und die Frage nach dem Beitrag Butenandts. In: Wolfgang Schieder u. Achim Trunk (Hrsg.): Adolf Butenandt und die Kaiser-Wilhelm-Gesellschaft. Wissenschaft, Industrie und Politik im ‚Dritten Reich‘. Göttingen 2004, S. 247-285.
 In memoriam Günther Hillmann. In: Clinical Chemistry and Laboratory Medicine. 13, Heft 7 (1975), S. 329–330, ISSN (Online) 1437-4331, ISSN (Print) 1434-6621, .
 Robert N. Proctor: Adolf Butenandt (1903–1995). Nobelpreisträger, Nationalsozialist und MPG-Präsident. Ein erster Blick in den Nachlaß. (= Ergebnisse. Vorabdrucke aus dem Forschungsprogramm „Geschichte der Kaiser-Wilhelm-Gesellschaft im Nationalsozialismus“; 2), Berlin 2000. (PDF)

References 

1919 births
1976 deaths
20th-century German chemists
People from Ludwigslust